Curtis Realious McClinton Jr. (born June 25, 1939) is a former collegiate and professional American football player. His father, Curtis McClinton Sr., served in the Kansas Senate.

McClinton attended Wichita North High School in Wichita, Kansas before attending the University of Kansas. A three-time All-Big Eight selection as a Jayhawk, McClinton led the team in rushing in 1959 and rushed for 1,377 yards during his college career.  Though he was selected by the Los Angeles Rams in the 10th round of the 1960 NFL draft, McClinton returned to Kansas for his senior season, helping them to a record of 7-3-1 and a berth in the 1961 Bluebonnet Bowl.  Kansas won the game over Rice University by a score of 33-7, with McClinton scoring KU's third touchdown of the game.  He was selected to the Sporting News and Pro Scouts All-American teams in 1961 and signed with the Dallas Texans after the season ended, having been drafted by them in the 14th round of the 1961 American Football League draft.  In 1969, McClinton was selected to KU's All-Time Team in football.  In 2001, he was inducted into the Kansas Sports Hall of Fame, and in 2004 he was inducted into KU's Ring of Honor, with his name now permanently displayed at KU's Memorial Stadium.

While at Kansas, McClinton was also a member of Kappa Alpha Psi fraternity, and a standout on the track team, winning the Big Eight championship in hurdles all three years he competed.  He graduated from KU in 1962, and later received a master's degree from Central Michigan University and a doctorate from Miles College.

McClinton went on to become one of the early stars of the American Football League, with the Dallas Texans, and with their successors, the Kansas City Chiefs, and is the sixth-leading rusher in franchise history. He had 762 rushing attempts for 3,124 yards and 18 touchdowns. He also caught 154 passes for 1,945 yards and 14 touchdowns. He played in three AFL All-Star games, following the 1962, 1966 and 1967 seasons. He was named the Outstanding player of the 1962 affair.

He was a member all three of the franchise's AFL title clubs and both Kansas City Chiefs Super Bowl teams, including the winners of the fourth and final AFL-NFL World Championship Game in January 1970. McClinton was named American Football League Rookie of the Year in 1962, when he rushed for 604 yards and caught 29 passes for 333 yards.  He was the first AFL Player to score a touchdown in a Super Bowl, catching a 7-yard pass in the second quarter of Super Bowl I. He was a backup tight end on the Super Bowl IV championship squad. He wore number 32 for the Chiefs, and is a member of the Chiefs' Hall of Fame.  He was inducted into the Missouri Sports Hall of Fame in 2007.

After his football career, McClinton became a registered banker and graduated from Harvard Kennedy School at Harvard University. He served as Deputy Mayor for Economic Development in Washington, D.C., and owned McClinton Development Company, a Kansas City-based construction contractor. He and his wife Devonne married in 1973 and look forward to celebrating 50 years. He has two daughters and six grandchildren.

See also
 List of American Football League players

References 

University of Kansas alumni
Harvard Kennedy School alumni
Kansas Jayhawks football players
Dallas Texans (AFL) players
Kansas City Chiefs players
American football tight ends
American Football League All-Star players
American Football League Rookies of the Year
1939 births
Living people
Players of American football from Oklahoma
Sportspeople from Muskogee, Oklahoma
Players of American football from Wichita, Kansas
American Football League players